Sylvester Okpe (born 7 December 2000) is a Nigerian cricketer, a former captain of the Nigeria under-19 cricket team, and the current captain of the Nigeria national cricket team.

Career
In April 2018, he was part of Nigeria's squad in the North-Western group of the 2018–19 ICC World Twenty20 Africa Qualifier tournament. In September 2018, he was named in Nigeria's squad for the 2018 Africa T20 Cup. He made his Twenty20 debut for Nigeria in the 2018 Africa T20 Cup on 14 September 2018.

In March 2019, he was named as the captain of Nigeria's squad for the Africa Division 1 qualifier tournament for the 2020 Under-19 Cricket World Cup. Nigeria went on to win the competition to qualify for the 2020 Under-19 Cricket World Cup, with Okpe named as the Player of the Tournament. In May 2019, he was named in Nigeria's squad for the Regional Finals of the 2018–19 ICC T20 World Cup Africa Qualifier tournament in Uganda. He made his Twenty20 International (T20I) debut for Nigeria against Kenya on 20 May 2019.

In October 2019, he was named as the vice-captain of Nigeria's squad for the 2019 ICC T20 World Cup Qualifier tournament in the United Arab Emirates. Ahead of the tournament, the International Cricket Council (ICC) named him as the player to watch in Nigeria's squad. He was the leading wicket-taker for Nigeria in the tournament, with five dismissals in five matches.

In December 2019, he was named as the captain of Nigeria's squad for the 2020 Under-19 Cricket World Cup. In October 2021, he was named as the captain of Nigeria's squad for the Regional Final of the 2021 ICC Men's T20 World Cup Africa Qualifier tournament in Rwanda.

References

External links
 

2000 births
Living people
Nigerian cricketers
Nigeria Twenty20 International cricketers
Place of birth missing (living people)